This article lists the birthplaces of astronauts from the United States' space program and other space travelers born in the United States or holding American citizenship.  Space travelers who did not work for NASA are indicated in italics.

American astronauts born in the United States
Astronauts who were born in 46 states, Guam, and the District of Columbia have flown in space. No astronauts have yet flown in space who were born in Alaska, Nevada, Vermont or Wyoming.

Alabama
 Birmingham: Henry Hartsfield — STS-4, STS-41-D, STS-61-A
 Cordova: James Voss — STS-44, STS-53, STS-69, STS-101, STS-102/105
 Decatur: Mae Jemison, first African-American woman in space — STS-47
 Mobile: Kathryn P. Hire — STS-90, STS-130
 Mobile: Clifton Williams (1932–1967) — No spaceflights
 Montgomery: Kathryn C. Thornton, first woman to make multiple EVAs — STS-33, STS-49, STS-61, STS-73

Arizona
 Huachuca City: Timothy Creamer — Soyuz TMA-17
 Phoenix: Steven Smith — STS-68, STS-82, STS-103, STS-110

Arkansas
 Fayetteville: Richard O. Covey — STS-51-I, STS-26, STS-38, STS-61
 Little Rock: Scott E. Parazynski — STS-66, STS-86, STS-95, STS-100, STS-120

California
 Arcadia: Tracy Caldwell — STS-118, Soyuz TMA-18
 Arcadia: Steven W. Lindsey — STS-87, STS-95, STS-104, STS-121, STS-133
 French Camp: José M. Hernández — STS-128
 Fresno: Barbara Morgan — STS-118 
 Fresno: James van Hoften — STS-41-C, STS-51-I
 Inglewood: Joseph M. Acaba — STS-119, Soyuz TMA-04M
 La Mesa: Frederick Sturckow — STS-88, STS-105, STS-117, STS-128
 Long Beach: Frederick Hauck — STS-7, STS-51-A, STS-26
 Los Angeles: Kevin P. Chilton — STS-49, STS-59, STS-76
 Los Angeles: Ellen Ochoa, first Hispanic woman in space — STS-56, STS-66, STS-96, STS-110
 North Hollywood: John D. Olivas — STS-117, STS-128
 Los Angeles: Sally Ride (1951–2012), first American woman in space — STS-7, STS-41-G
 Los Angeles: Francisco Rubio — Soyuz MS-22
 Orange: Bryan D. O'Connor — STS-61-B, STS-40
 Palo Alto: Pamela Melroy — STS-92, STS-112, STS-120
 Pasadena: Alan G. Poindexter (1961–2012) — STS-122, STS-131
 Redwood City: Rex J. Walheim — STS-110, STS-122, STS-135
 Sacramento: Michael Coats — STS-41-D, STS-29, STS-39
 Sacramento: Stephen Robinson — STS-85, STS-95, STS-114, STS-130
 San Bernardino: Michael Clifford — STS-53, STS-59, STS-76
 San Diego: Stanley G. Love — STS-122
 San Diego: William C. McCool (1961–2003), died on the Columbia — STS-107
 San Diego: Michael J. McCulley — STS-34
 San Diego: Josh A. Cassada — SpaceX Crew-5
 San Francisco: John Young (1930–2018), first NASA astronaut to fly five and six times, first man to orbit the moon twice — Gemini 3, Gemini 10, Apollo 10, Apollo 16, STS-1, STS-9
 Pomona: Victor J. Glover — first African American astronaut to go to the ISS on a long-duration flight — Crew Dragon Resilience
Petaluma: Nicole Aunapu Mann — SpaceX Crew-5

Colorado
 Boulder: Scott Carpenter (1925–2013) — Mercury 7
 Colorado Springs: Dorothy M. Metcalf-Lindenburger — STS-131
 Del Norte: Kent Rominger — STS-73, STS-80, STS-85, STS-96, STS-100
 Denver: Gerald P. Carr — Skylab 4
 Denver: John M. Lounge — STS-51-I, STS-26, STS-35
 Denver: John "Jack" Swigert (1931–1982) — Apollo 13
 Durango: Stuart Roosa (1933–1994) — Apollo 14
 Longmont: Vance D. Brand — Apollo-Soyuz Test Project, STS-5, STS-41-B, STS-35
 Louisville: Jack D. Fischer — Soyuz MS-04

Connecticut
 Farmington: Kathleen Rubins — Soyuz MS-01
 Groton: Pierre Thuot — STS-36, STS-49, STS-62
 Hartford: Sherwood C. Spring — STS-61-B
 Manchester: Daniel C. Burbank — STS-106, STS-115, Soyuz TMA-22
 Norwalk: Daniel T. Barry — STS-72, STS-96, STS-105
 Waterbury: Richard Mastracchio — STS-106, STS-118, STS-131

Delaware
 Wilmington: Nancy Currie — STS-57, STS-70, STS-88, STS-109

District of Columbia
 Washington: B. Alvin Drew — STS-118, STS-133
 Washington: Frederick D. Gregory — STS-51-B, STS-33, STS-44
 Washington: Lisa Nowak — STS-121
 Washington: Robert L. Stewart — STS-41-B, STS-51-J

Florida
 Cocoa Beach: Jan Davis — STS-47, STS-60, STS-85
 Jacksonville: Wendy B. Lawrence — STS-67, STS-86, STS-91, STS-114
 Key West: Richard N. Richards — STS-28, STS-41, STS-50, STS-64
 Marianna: Norman Thagard — STS-7, STS-51-B, STS-30, STS-42, Soyuz TM-21/STS-71
 Miami: Eric A. Boe — STS-126, STS-133
 Miami: William B. Lenoir (1939–2010) — STS-5
 Miami: Bill Nelson, second politician in space — STS-61-C
 Miami: Winston E. Scott — STS-72, STS-87
 Tallahassee: Samuel T. Durrance — STS-35, STS-67

Georgia
 Albany: Thomas J. Hennen — STS-44
 Atlanta: Roy D. Bridges, Jr. — STS-51-F
 Augusta: Susan Still — STS-83, STS-94
 Columbus: David M. Walker, (1944–2001) — STS-51-A, STS-30, STS-53, STS-69
 Macon: Sonny Carter, (1947–1991) — STS-33
 Savannah: L. Blaine Hammond — STS-39, STS-64

Guam
 Hagåtña: Sian Proctor — Inspiration4

Hawaii
 Honolulu: K. Megan McArthur — STS-125
 Kealakekua: Ellison Onizuka (1946–1986), died on the Challenger — STS-51-C, STS-51-L

Idaho
 Mountain Home Air Force Base: James F. Reilly — STS-89, STS-104, STS-117
 Pocatello: Kayla Barron — SpaceX Crew-3

Illinois
 Belleville: Sandra Magnus — STS-112, STS-126/119, STS-135
 Canton: Steven R. Nagel — STS-51-G, STS-61-A, STS-37, STS-55
 Chanute Air Force Base: Carl J. Meade — STS-38, STS-50, STS-64
 Chicago: Gene Cernan (1934–2017) — Gemini 9A, Apollo 10, Apollo 17
 Chicago: John M. Grunsfeld — STS-67, STS-81, STS-103, STS-109, STS-125
 Chicago: Joan Higginbotham — STS-116
 Chicago: Ken Mattingly — Apollo 16, STS-4, STS-51-C
 Chicago: James McDivitt — Gemini 4, Apollo 9
 Chicago: Charles Veach (1944–1995) — STS-39, STS-52
 Danville: Joseph R. Tanner — STS-66, STS-82, STS-97, STS-115
 Lincoln: Scott Altman — STS-90, STS-106, STS-109, STS-125
 Oak Park: Lee Archambault — STS-117, STS-119
 Oak Park: Joseph P. Kerwin — Skylab 2
 Rock Island: Gary Payton — STS-51-C

Indiana
 Bedford: Charles Walker — STS-41-D, STS-51-D, STS-61-B
 Crawfordsville: Joseph P. Allen — STS-5, STS-51-A
 Crown Point: Jerry L. Ross — STS-61-B, STS-27, STS-37, STS-55, STS-74, STS-88, STS-110
 Gary: Frank Borman, commanded the first spaceflight to orbit the Moon — Gemini 7, Apollo 8
 Indianapolis: Serena M. Auñón — Expedition 56 Expedition 57
 Indianapolis: Anthony W. England — STS-51-F
 Indianapolis: David Wolf — STS-58, STS-86/89, STS-112, STS-127
 Lafayette: Donald Williams (1942–2016) — STS-51-D, STS-34
 Mitchell: Gus Grissom (1926–1967), first NASA astronaut to go into space twice. Died in the Apollo 1 launchpad fire — Mercury-Redstone 4, Gemini 3
 Portland: Kevin A. Ford — STS-128, Soyuz TMA-06M
 South Bend: Janice E. Voss (1956–2012) — STS-57, STS-63, STS-83, STS-94, STS-99
 Valparaiso: Mark N. Brown — STS-28, STS-48

Iowa
 Ames: Laurel Clark (1961–2003), died on the Columbia — STS-107
 Burlington: James M. Kelly — STS-102, STS-114
 Charles City: George Nelson — STS-41-C, STS-61-C, STS-26
 Clinton: David C. Hilmers — STS-51-J, STS-26, STS-36, STS-42
 Creston: Walter Cunningham — Apollo 7
 Jefferson: Loren Shriver — STS-51-C, STS-31, STS-46
 Mount Ayr: Peggy Whitson — STS-111/113, Soyuz TMA-11

Kansas
Belleville: Nick Hague — Soyuz MS-10, Soyuz MS-12
Chapman: Joseph Henry Engle — STS-2, STS-51-I
 Ottawa: Steven Hawley — STS-41-D, STS-61-C, STS-31, STS-82, STS-93
 St. Francis: Ronald Evans (1933–1990) — Apollo 17

Kentucky
 Fort Knox: Randolph Bresnik — STS-129
 Russellville: Terrence Wilcutt — STS-68, STS-79, STS-89, STS-106

Louisiana
 Baton Rouge: Hayley Arceneaux — Inspiration4
 Lake Charles: Dominic L. Pudwill Gorie — STS-91, STS-99, STS-108, STS-123
 West Monroe: James D. Halsell — STS-65, STS-74, STS-83, STS-94, STS-101

Maine
 Bar Harbor: Charles O. Hobaugh — STS-104, STS-108, STS-129
 Caribou: Jessica Meir — Soyuz MS-15

Maryland
 Baltimore: Robert Curbeam — STS-85, STS-98, STS-116
 Baltimore: Marsha Ivins — STS-32, STS-46, STS-62, STS-81, STS-98
 Baltimore: Thomas David Jones — STS-59, STS-68, STS-80, STS-98
 Baltimore: Terry W. Virts — STS-130, Soyuz TMA-15M
 Baltimore: Gregory R. Wiseman — Soyuz TMA-13M
 Cheverly: Richard R. Arnold — STS-119
Gaithersburg: Jessica Watkins — SpaceX Crew-4
 Patuxent River: Kenneth S. Reightler, Jr. — STS-48, STS-60

Massachusetts
 Attleboro: Scott D. Tingle — Expedition 54, Expedition 55
 Boston: Brian Duffy — STS-45, STS-57, STS-72, STS-92
 Boston: Christa McAuliffe (1948–1986) — No spaceflights; died on the Challenger
 Boston: Bruce McCandless II (1937–2017) — STS-41-B, STS-31
 Boston: Story Musgrave — STS-6, STS-51-F, STS-33, STS-44, STS-61, STS-80
 Boston: Brian O'Leary — No spaceflights
 Boston: Albert Sacco — STS-73
 Boston: Stephanie Wilson — STS-121, STS-120, STS-131
 Cohasset: Stephen G. Bowen — STS-126, STS-132, STS-133, SpaceX Crew-6
 Lowell: Richard M. Linnehan — STS-78, STS-90, STS-109, STS-123
 Salem: Christopher Cassidy — STS-127
 Springfield: Jerome Apt — STS-37, STS-47, STS-59, STS-79
 Springfield: Ed Lu — STS-84, STS-106, Soyuz TMA-2
 Waltham: Charles J. Precourt — STS-55, STS-71, STS-84, STS-91

Michigan
 Cass City: Brewster H. Shaw — STS-9, STS-61-B, STS-28
 Detroit: Dominic A. Antonelli — STS-119, STS-132
 Detroit: Gregory Jarvis (1944–1986) — No spaceflights; died on the Challenger
 East Detroit: Jerry M. Linenger — STS-64, STS-81/84
 Flint: Michael J. Bloomfield — STS-86, STS-97, STS-110
 Flint: Donald R. McMonagle — STS-39, STS-54, STS-66
 Grand Rapids: Roger B. Chaffee (1935–1967) — No spaceflights; died on Apollo 1
 Grand Rapids: Christina Koch — Soyuz MS-12, Soyuz MS-13
 Grand Rapids: Jack R. Lousma — Skylab 3, STS-3
 Jackson: Alfred Worden — Apollo 15
 Mount Clemens: Richard A. Searfoss — STS-58, STS-76, STS-90
 Muskegon: David Leestma — STS-41-G, STS-28, STS-45
 Pontiac: Brent W. Jett, Jr. — STS-72, STS-81, STS-97, STS-115

Minnesota
 Fairmont: Dale Gardner — STS-8, STS-51-A
 Minneapolis: Robert D. Cabana — STS-41, STS-53, STS-65, STS-88
 Parkers Prairie: Karen L. Nyberg — STS-124, Soyuz TMA-09M
 St. Paul: Duane G. Carey — STS-109
 St. Paul: Heidemarie M. Stefanyshyn-Piper — STS-115, STS-126

Mississippi
 Biloxi: Fred Haise — Apollo 13
 Fayette: Richard H. Truly — STS-2, STS-8
 Winona: Donald H. Peterson — STS-6

Missouri
 Cape Girardeau: Linda M. Godwin — STS-37, STS-59, STS-76, STS-108
 Carthage: Janet L. Kavandi — STS-91, STS-99, STS-104
 Lebanon: Michael S. Hopkins — Soyuz TMA-10M SpaceX Crew-1
 St. Ann: Robert L. Behnken — STS-123, STS-130, SpX-DM2
 St. Louis: Thomas Akers — STS-41, STS-49, STS-61, STS-79
 St. Louis: Robert C. Springer — STS-29, STS-38

Montana
 Lewistown: Loren Acton — STS-51-F

Nebraska
 Omaha: Clayton Anderson — STS-117/120, STS-131

New Hampshire
 Derry: Alan Shepard (1923–1998), first American in space — Mercury-Redstone 3, Apollo 14
 Manchester: Lee M.E. Morin — STS-110

New Jersey
 Bernards Township: Jared Isaacman – Inspiration4
 Englewood: Gregory Linteris — STS-83, STS-94
 Glen Ridge: Buzz Aldrin, the second person to walk on the Moon — Gemini 12, Apollo 11
 Hackensack: William Pailes — STS-51-J
 Hackensack: Wally Schirra (1923–2007), first NASA astronaut to fly three times — Mercury 8, Gemini 6A, Apollo 7
 Jersey City: George D. Zamka — STS-120, STS-130
 Morristown: Garrett Reisman — STS-123/124, STS-132
 Neptune: Rusty Schweickart — Apollo 9
 Orange: Mark E. Kelly — STS-108, STS-121, STS-124, STS-134
 Orange: Scott J. Kelly — STS-103, STS-118, Soyuz TMA-01M, Soyuz TMA-17M
 Paterson: Mark L. Polansky — STS-98, STS-116, STS-127
 Paterson: Kathryn Dwyer Sullivan, first American woman to walk in space — STS-41-G, STS-31, STS-45
 Plainfield: Kenneth Ham — STS-124, STS-132

New Mexico
 Albuquerque: Sidney M. Gutierrez — STS-40, STS-59
 Carlsbad: F. Drew Gaffney — STS-40
 Santa Rita: Harrison Schmitt — Apollo 17

New York
 Albany: Nicole P. Stott — STS-128, STS-133
 Amityville: Kevin R. Kregel — STS-70, STS-78, STS-87, STS-99
 Binghamton: Douglas H. Wheelock — STS-120, Soyuz TMA-19
 Buffalo: Edward Gibson — Skylab 4
 Buffalo: James Pawelczyk — STS-90
 Cooperstown: Robert L. Gibson — STS-41-B, STS-61-C, STS-27, STS-47, STS-71
 Elmira: Eileen Collins, first female Shuttle Commander — STS-63, STS-84, STS-93, STS-114
 Endicott: Douglas G. Hurley — STS-127, STS-135, SpX-DM2
 Lockport: William G. Gregory — STS-67
 New York: Karol J. Bobko, first graduate of the United States Air Force Academy to become an astronaut — STS-6, STS-51-D, STS-51-J
 New York: Jay C. Buckey — STS-90
 New York (Queens): Charles Camarda — STS-114
 New York (Brooklyn): Martin J. Fettman — STS-58
 New York: Anna Lee Fisher — STS-51-A
 New York: Ronald J. Grabe — STS-51-J, STS-30, STS-42, STS-57
 New York (Brooklyn): Jeffrey A. Hoffman — STS-51-D, STS-35, STS-46, STS-61, STS-75
 New York: Bruce E. Melnick — STS-41, STS-49
 New York (Brooklyn): Gregory Olsen, third space tourist — Soyuz TMA-7/6
 New York: Robert A. Parker — STS-9, STS-35
 New York (Bronx): Mario Runco, Jr. — STS-44, STS-54, STS-77
 New York (Queens): Dennis Tito, first space tourist — Soyuz TM-32/31
 New York (Queens): Jim Wetherbee — STS-32, STS-52, STS-63, STS-86, STS-102, STS-113
 Oceanside: Michael Massimino — STS-109, STS-125
 Plattsburgh: Michael P. Anderson, (1959–2003), died on the Columbia — STS-89, STS-107
 Rochester: C. Gordon Fullerton (1936–2013) — STS-3, STS-51-F
 Southampton: Mary L. Cleave — STS-61-B, STS-30
 Syracuse: Lawrence J. DeLucas — STS-50
 Syracuse: Jeanette J. Epps — No spaceflights.
 Syracuse: Steven Swanson — STS-117, STS-119
 Warsaw: James C. Adamson — STS-28, STS-43
 Yonkers: Ronald J. Garan, Jr. — STS-124

North Carolina
 Beaufort: Michael J. Smith (1945–1986) — No spaceflights; died on the Challenger
 Charlotte: Charles Moss Duke, Jr. — Apollo 16
 Charlotte: Susan J. Helms — STS-54, STS-64, STS-78, STS-101, STS-102/105
 Elizabethtown: Curtis Brown — STS-47, STS-66, STS-77, STS-85, STS-95, STS-103
 Faison: William E. Thornton — STS-8, STS-51-B
 Fayetteville: Ellen S. Baker — STS-34, STS-50, STS-71
Fayettevile: Robert Hines — SpaceX Crew-4
 Laurinburg: William S. McArthur — STS-58, STS-74, STS-92, Soyuz TMA-7
 Pinehurst: Charles E. Brady, Jr. (1951–2006) — STS-78
 Statesville: Thomas Marshburn — STS-127, Soyuz TMA-07M, SpaceX Crew-2

North Dakota
 Jamestown: Richard Hieb — STS-39, STS-49, STS-65
 New Rockford: James Buchli — STS-51-C, STS-61-A, STS-29, STS-48

Ohio
 Akron: Judith Resnik (1949–1986), died on the Challenger — STS-41-D
 Bryan: Terence T. Henricks — STS-44, STS-55, STS-70, STS-78
 Cambridge: John Glenn (1921–2016), first American in Earth orbit, U.S. Senator, and oldest person to make a spaceflight — Mercury 6, STS-95
 Cincinnati: Karl Gordon Henize (1926–1993) — STS-51-F
 Cleveland: Kenneth D. Cameron — STS-37, STS-56, STS-74
 Cleveland: Gregory J. Harbaugh — STS-39, STS-54, STS-71, STS-82
 Cleveland: Jim Lovell, first NASA astronaut to fly four times, first man to fly to the moon twice — Gemini 7, Gemini 12, Apollo 8, Apollo 13
 Cleveland: G. David Low (1956–2008) — STS-32, STS-43, STS-57
 Cleveland: Donald A. Thomas — STS-65, STS-70, STS-83, STS-94
 Cleveland: Carl Walz — STS-51, STS-65, STS-79, STS-108/111
 Cleveland: Mary E. Weber — STS-70, STS-101
 Columbus: Donn F. Eisele (1930–1987) — Apollo 7
 Columbus: Michael Foreman — STS-123, STS-129
 Dayton: Charles Bassett (1931–1966) — No spaceflights
 Dayton: Larry Connor — Axiom-1
 Euclid: Sunita Williams — STS-116/117, Soyuz TMA-05M
 Lorain: Robert F. Overmyer (1936–1996) — STS-5, STS-51-B
 Macedonia: Ronald Sega — STS-60, STS-76
 Mansfield: Michael L. Gernhardt — STS-69, STS-83, STS-94, STS-104
 Parma: Michael T. Good — STS-125, STS-132
 Wapakoneta: Neil Armstrong (1930–2012), piloted first docking in space, first person to land a spacecraft on the Moon, first person to walk on the Moon — Gemini 8, Apollo 11
 Warren: Ronald A. Parise (1951–2008) — STS-35, STS-67

Oklahoma
 Enid: Owen K. Garriott — Skylab 3, STS-9
 Okemah: William R. Pogue — Skylab 4
 Shawnee: Gordon Cooper (1927–2004), the first American to fly in space for a day — Mercury 9, Gemini 5
 Weatherford: Thomas Patten Stafford, only person to fly twice in 6 months — Gemini 6A, Gemini 9A, Apollo 10, Apollo-Soyuz Test Project
 Wetumka: John Herrington, first Native American in space — STS-113

Oregon
 Eugene: James Dutton — STS-131
 Portland: S. David Griggs (1938–1989) — STS-51-D
 Silverton: Donald Pettit — STS-113/Soyuz TMA-1, STS-126, Soyuz TMA-03M

Pennsylvania
 Abington: John-David F. Bartoe — STS-51-F
 Bristol: Daniel W. Bursch — STS-51, STS-68, STS-77, STS-108, STS-111
 Erie: Paul J. Weitz — Skylab 2, STS-6
 Haverford: Theodore Freeman (1930–1964) — No spaceflights
 Indiana: Patricia Robertson (1963–2001) — No spaceflights
 Lancaster: Andrew J. Feustel — STS-125, STS-134
 Philadelphia: Andrew M. Allen — STS-46, STS-62, STS-75
 Philadelphia: James P. Bagian — STS-29, STS-40
 Philadelphia: Guion Bluford, first African-American in space — STS-8, STS-61-A, STS-39, STS-53
 Philadelphia: Pete Conrad (1930–1999), commanded first precision landing on the moon — Gemini 5, Gemini 11, Apollo 12, Skylab 2
 Philadelphia: Christopher Ferguson — STS-115, STS-126, STS-135
 Philadelphia: Scott J. Horowitz — STS-75, STS-82, STS-101, STS-105
 Pittsburgh: Michael Fincke — Soyuz TMA-4, Soyuz TMA-13, STS-134
 Pittsburgh: Stephen Frick — STS-110, STS-122
 Pittsburgh: Terry Jonathan Hart — STS-41-C
 Pittsburgh: Warren Hoburg — SpaceX Crew-6
 Pittsburgh: James Irwin (1930–1991) — Apollo 15
 Ridley Park: Daniel Tani — STS-108, STS-120/122
 Scranton: Paul W. Richards — STS-102
 Stroudsburg: Byron Lichtenberg, first NASA payload specialist — STS-9, STS-45
 Uniontown: Robert J. Cenker — STS-61-C

Rhode Island
 Quonset Point: William F. Readdy — STS-42, STS-51, STS-79

South Carolina
 Charleston: Catherine Coleman — STS-73, STS-93, Soyuz TMA-20
 Charleston: Frank L. Culbertson, Jr. — STS-38, STS-51, STS-105/108
 Columbia: Charles Bolden — STS-61-C, STS-31, STS-45, STS-60
 Greenville: John Casper — STS-36, STS-54, STS-62, STS-77
 Lake City: Ronald McNair (1950–1986), died on the Challenger — STS-41-B

South Dakota
 Sioux Falls: Michael E. Fossum — STS-121, STS-124, Soyuz TMA-02M
 Yankton: Charles D. Gemar — STS-38, STS-48, STS-62

Tennessee
 Chattanooga: Tamara E. Jernigan — STS-40, STS-52, STS-67, STS-80, STS-96
 Jamestown: Roger K. Crouch — STS-83, STS-94
 Memphis: Michael A. Baker — STS-43, STS-52, STS-68, STS-81
 Memphis: John S. Bull (1934–2008) — No spaceflights
 Murfreesboro: Margaret Rhea Seddon — STS-51-D, STS-40, STS-58
 Murfreesboro: Barry E. Wilmore — STS-129
 Oak Ridge: William Shepherd — STS-27, STS-41, STS-52, Soyuz TM-31/STS-102

Texas
 Amarillo: Rick Husband (1957–2003), died on the Columbia — STS-96, STS-107
 Amarillo: Paul Lockhart — STS-111, STS-113
 Austin: Kenneth Cockrell — STS-56, STS-69, STS-80, STS-98, STS-111
 Austin: Timothy L. Kopra — STS-127/128
 Beaumont: Robert Crippen, flew on first Space Shuttle mission — STS-1, STS-7, STS-41-C, STS-41-G
 Dallas: Jeffrey Ashby — STS-93, STS-100, STS-112
 Dallas: William Frederick Fisher — STS-51-I
 Dallas: Donald Holmquest — No spaceflights
 Dallas: Elliot See (1927–1966) — No spaceflights
 El Paso: Patrick G. Forrester — STS-105, STS-117, STS-128
 Goose Creek: John M. Fabian — STS-7, STS-51-G
 Hereford: Edgar Mitchell (1930–2016) — Apollo 14
 Houston: Shannon Walker — Soyuz TMA-19
 Killeen: Robert S. Kimbrough — STS-126
 Mineral Wells: Millie Hughes-Fulford, first female Payload Specialist — STS-40
 Orange: John Oliver Creighton — STS-51-G, STS-36, STS-48
 Quanah: Edward Givens (1930–1967) — No spaceflights
 Randolph Air Force Base: David Scott, first to drive a wheeled vehicle on the moon — Gemini 8, Apollo 9, Apollo 15
 San Antonio: John E. Blaha — STS-29, STS-33, STS-43, STS-58, STS-79/81
 San Antonio: Ed White (1930–1967), first American to perform an EVA. Died in the Apollo 1 disaster — Gemini 4
 Temple: Bernard A. Harris Jr., first African-American to walk in space. — STS-55, STS-63
 Wheeler: Alan Bean — Apollo 12, Skylab 3
 Wichita Falls: Richard Mullane — STS-41-D, STS-27, STS-36

Utah
 Midvale: Don L. Lind — STS-51-B
 Richfield: Jake Garn, ex-U. S. Senator, first politician in space — STS-51-D

Vermont
 Newport: Duane Graveline — No spaceflights

Virginia
 Altavista: Guy Gardner — STS-27, STS-35
 Arlington: David McDowell Brown (1956–2003), died on the Columbia — STS-107
 Falls Church: Mark T. Vande Hei — Expedition 53/54
 Fort Belvoir: William Oefelein — STS-116
 Fort Belvoir: John L. Phillips — STS-100, Soyuz TMA-6, STS-119
 Hampton: Robert Satcher — STS-129
 Lynchburg: Leland D. Melvin — STS-122, STS-129
 Norfolk: Peter Wisoff — STS-57, STS-68, STS-81, STS-92
 Portsmouth: Ken Bowersox — STS-50, STS-61, STS-73, STS-82, STS-113/Soyuz TMA-1
 Richmond: Joe F. Edwards, Jr. — STS-89

Washington
 Cle Elum: Dick Scobee (1939–1986), died on the Challenger — STS-41-C
 Seattle: Richard F. Gordon, Jr. — Gemini 11, Apollo 12
 Seattle: Gregory C. Johnson — STS-125
 Seattle: Stephen S. Oswald — STS-42, STS-56, STS-67
 Spokane: Anne C. McClain — Soyuz MS-11
 Sunnyside: Bonnie J. Dunbar — STS-61-A, STS-32, STS-50, STS-71, STS-89
 Vancouver: Michael R. Barratt — Soyuz TMA-14, STS-133
Seattle: Christopher Sembroski — Inspiration4

West Virginia
 Charleston: Jon McBride — STS-41-G
 Morgantown: Drew Morgan — Soyuz MS-13, Soyuz MS-15

Wisconsin
 La Crosse: Curt Michel — No spaceflights
 Milwaukee: Leroy Chiao — STS-65, STS-72, STS-92, Soyuz TMA-5
 Milwaukee: Raja Chari — SpaceX Crew-3
 Sparta: Deke Slayton (1924–1993) — Apollo-Soyuz Test Project
 Superior: Jeffrey Williams — STS-101, Soyuz TMA-8, Soyuz TMA-16
 Viroqua: Mark C. Lee — STS-30, STS-47, STS-64, STS-82
 Watertown: Daniel Brandenstein — STS-8, STS-51-G, STS-32, STS-49

American astronauts born in other countries

Australia
Adelaide: Andy Thomas — STS-77, STS-89, STS-91, STS-102, STS-114
Melbourne: Philip K. Chapman — No spaceflights
Sydney: Paul D. Scully-Power — STS-41-G

Canada
Montreal: Gregory Chamitoff — STS-124/126, STS-134

Costa Rica
San José: Franklin Chang Díaz — STS-34, STS-46, STS-60, STS-61-C, STS-75, STS-91, STS-111

China
Shanghai: Shannon Lucid. An American born in China to missionaries, she held the record for the longest duration stay in space by an American, as well as by a woman. — STS-51-G, STS-34, STS-43, STS-58, STS-76/Mir NASA-1/STS-79

Taiwan
Taipei: Kjell Lindgren -Soyuz TMA-17M, SpaceX Crew-4

Hungary
Budapest: Charles Simonyi. Fifth space tourist — Soyuz TMA-10/9, Soyuz TMA-14/13

India 

 Karnal: Kalpana Chawla (1962-2003), first Indian-American in space. Died in the Space Shuttle Columbia disaster — STS-87, STS-107

Iran

Mashhad: Anousheh Ansari, first Iranian-American in space. Fourth space tourist and first female space tourist. — Soyuz TMA-9/8

Peru
Lima: Carlos I. Noriega — STS-84, STS-97

The Netherlands
 Sluiskil:  Lodewijk van den Berg — STS-51-B

Spain
 Madrid: Michael López-Alegría — STS-73, STS-92, STS-113, Soyuz TMA-9,  Axiom-1

United Kingdom
 Cambridge, England: Richard Garriott — Soyuz TMA-13/12
 Cardiff, Wales: Anthony Llewellyn — No spaceflights
 Crowborough, England: Piers Sellers  — STS-112, STS-121, STS-132
 Louth, England: Michael Foale, dual British and American citizen — STS-45, STS-56, STS-63, STS-84/86, STS-103, Soyuz TMA-3
 Saltburn-by-the-Sea, England: Nicholas Patrick — STS-116, STS-130
 South Ruislip, England: Gregory H. Johnson  — STS-123, STS-134

External links
NASA Astronaut Fact Book
Space Facts – U.S. Astronauts

Lists of astronauts
Birthplaces